Aranmanai Kili is a 1993 Indian Tamil-language romantic drama film written, produced and directed by Rajkiran in his directorial debut. He also stars alongside Ahana and Gayathri. The film was released on 16 April 1993. It was remade in Telugu as Maa Voori Maaraju (1995), and in Kannada as Neelakanta (2006).

Plot 

Raasaiyya is a servant of a rich family which belongs to Poongodi, who secretly loves him. While Chellamma, a poor girl, was kidnapped and forced into prostitution, Raasaiyya saves her and takes her to his village. It remains to be seen what fate has in store for the three of them.

Cast 
Rajkiran as Raasaiyya
Ahana as Poongodi
Gayathri as Chellamma
Vadivelu as Kaththayya
C. R. Vijayakumari as Raasaiya's mother
Sangili Murugan as Raasaiya's father
Ilavarasi as Poongodi's mother
V. Nambirajan as Poongodi's uncle
Kanal Kannan as Henchman (special appearance)

Production 
Aranmanai Kili is the directorial debut of Rajkiran who also produced the film, wrote the script and starred as the male lead. The film is the acting debut for Ahana and Gayathri; both were chosen from over 300 girls who auditioned. Cinematography was handled by Kichas.

Soundtrack 
The soundtrack was composed by Ilaiyaraaja and lyrics were written by Vaali, Piraisoodan, Muthulingam and Ponnadiyaan. Though the soundtrack has nine songs, only seven feature onscreen.

Release and reception 
Aranmanai Kili was released on 16 April 1993. Malini Mannath wrote in The Indian Express, "The film-maker reportedly delayed the shooting as he had not found a suitable heroine. He could have waited a little longer!". K. Vijian of New Straits Times wrote "Go and watch this movie with an open mind. You may then able to enjoy Aranmanai Kili". C. R. K. of Kalki wrote that the incidents and comedic sequences in the film were natural without any kind of fiction.

References

External links 
 

1990s Tamil-language films
1993 directorial debut films
1993 films
1993 romantic drama films
Films scored by Ilaiyaraaja
Indian romantic drama films
Tamil films remade in other languages